Charlotte Green (born 16 May 1994) is an English female  BMX rider, from Threemilestone, near Truro, Cornwall. She has represented Great Britain at international competitions. She competed in the time trial event and race event at the 2015 UCI BMX World Championships.

References

External links
 
 

1994 births
Living people
BMX riders
English female cyclists
Place of birth missing (living people)